Jonathan Goldstein is a British solicitor and entrepreneur. He is co-founder and CEO of the multinational investment firm Cain International, and a director and co-owner of Chelsea F.C.

Early life and education 

Goldstein attended Ilford County High School, and later graduated from the University of Manchester with a degree in law, in 1987.

Career 

Following law school, he joined London-based multinational law firm SJ Berwin. In 1992, Goldstein joined Olswang LLP, where, according to firm founder Simon Olswang, writing in 2016; he gained prominence as a "wunderkind", becoming a partner at age 28, and then the youngest CEO of a London law firm, at age 32. Goldstein led the firm's rapid growth and global expansion. Olswang was then referenced as "the hippest law firm in town" and was awarded "Law Firm of the Year", several times, by Chambers and Partners, during Goldstein's tenure.

After 15 years at Olswang, in 2007, he then joined Gerald Ronson's property company, Heron International, as managing director, later becoming deputy CEO. In 2010, Ronson Capital Partners was founded, and Goldstein was appointed CEO.

In 2013, he was appointed the inaugural head of European real estate and direct investments for global investment firm Guggenheim Partners. In 2014, Goldstein co-founded Cain Hoy Enterprises with two other Guggenheim Partners alumni, Henry Silverman and Eldridge Industries chair Todd Boehly, with minority backing from Guggenheim Partners. The firm rebranded to Cain International in 2017 and, by 2022, had over $14 billion in assets under management across Europe and the United States. In 2022, Goldstein was part of a consortium of buyers who acquired Chelsea F.C. from billionaire Roman Abramovich. The deal was finalized on May 30, 2022 and Goldstein became co-owner and director of Chelsea F.C. In October 2022, Goldstein stated that Chelsea's ownership were looking to maximize the team's potential, and were in the early stages of planning to redevelop Stamford Bridge.

Personal life and affiliations 

Goldstein was elected chair of the Jewish Leadership Council, in May 2017, for which he has been a vocal spokesman, and a critic of Labour leader Jeremy Corbyn, in media and while addressing a rally outside of Parliament, in March 2018.

He chairs the Trust of the Chief Rabbi of the United Hebrew Congregations of the Commonwealth. He is also a trustee of The Gerald & Gail Ronson Family Foundation.

He resides in North West London, he is also co-president of Camp Simcha, a non-profit children's mental health support organisation. His maternal grandfather was a founder of Ilford United Synagogue.

References

External links 

 Leaders of Real Estate – Milken Institute
 Milken Institute Global Conference – CNBC
 What to watch at the Milken Institute conference – CNN Business

British Jews
British chief executives
Year of birth missing (living people)
Living people
Alumni of the University of Manchester
Chelsea F.C. chairmen and investors